Pristimantis phoxocephalus is a species of frog in the family Strabomantidae.
It is found in Ecuador and Peru.
Its natural habitats are tropical moist montane forests, high-altitude shrubland, rural gardens, and heavily degraded former forest.
It is threatened by habitat loss.

References

phoxocephalus
Amphibians of the Andes
Amphibians of Ecuador
Amphibians of Peru
Amphibians described in 1979
Taxonomy articles created by Polbot